WSKN (1320 AM) is a radio station. WSKN serves San Juan, Puerto Rico and is owned by Media Power Group. The station serves as the flagship station of the Radio Isla Network and carries a Spanish-language news and talk format.

The callsign derives from their previous identification, Super Kadena Noticiosa, which was created on May 11, 1992, under the ownership of Radio Kadena Informativa Inc. The station was on frequency 630 AM. WUNO Notiuno bought them in 2000 and switched frequencies (Notiuno was on 1320 AM).

History

Early years
The station's news director is Luis Penchi, a Ponce-born radio journalist with over 30 years of broadcast experience. Upon being hired by WSKN, he transferred his highly rated Saturday-morning news programming from WIAC, the Radio Puerto Rico network.  The programming included a weekly political debate panel with former Senate President Kenneth McClintock, Senate PDP Minority Leader José Luis Dalmau and Movimiento Independentista Nacional Hostosiano (MINH) leader, Dr. Héctor Pesquera, and the "Luis Penchi Entrevista" 90-minute news interview program. During the week, Penchi attracted many of the islands' top political analysts to its programming, including attorneys Benny Frankie Cerezo, Carlos Gallisá and Ignacio Rivera, as well as businessman-turned-political-figure Adolfo Krans, the former First Spouse during his former wife Sila Calderón's gubernatorial administration. As a result, the station has been able to attract many of Puerto Rico's political 'cognoscenti' to its audience.

Recent news
On December 1, 2009, Penchi resigned from the position of news director, and news reporter Julio Rivera Saniel was named to replace him. Rivera Saniel had previously worked at WKAQ 580, and still works on WAPA TV's weekends newscasts (Noticentro Sábado y Noticentro Domingo). On November 1, 2013 Jonathan Lebrón Ayala was named news director after Rivera Saniel resigned to the position he previously held from 2009.  Lebrón Ayala is a young news reporter that was the multimedia editor of Metro in Puerto Rico, a daily free newspaper owned by Metro International. Also has worked with WKAQ, a Univision Radio Puerto Rico station and with El Nuevo Dia a newspaper owned by the Ferré Rangel family. Rivera Saniel would stay in WSKN with two new shows and still works on WAPA-TV newscasts.

Ownership
In June 2003, Media Power Group Inc. (Eduardo Rivero Albino, chairman, Gilberto Rivera Gutierrez, Jose E. Fernandez and Joe Pagan, shareholders) reached an agreement to purchase four AM radio stations in Puerto Rico, including WSKN, from Arso Radio Corp. (Jesus M. Soto, owner) for a reported $6.8 million.

References

External links
FCC History Cards for WSKN
Radio Isla 1320 WSKN official website

News and talk radio stations in Puerto Rico
SKN
Radio stations established in 1949
1949 establishments in Puerto Rico